West Irvington is an unincorporated community in Lancaster County in the U. S. state of Virginia.

References

There isn't a west Irvington. There's an Irvington, Virginia in Lancaster county. It is an upper class town, which is home of the Tides inn resort.

Unincorporated communities in Virginia
Lancaster County, Virginia